California Courier may refer to:

 The California Courier, English-language Armenian newspaper in USA
 California Courier (19th century), newspaper edited by Thomas J. Dryer